Timpson Independent School District is a public school district based in Timpson, Texas (USA).  In 2009, the school district was rated "academically acceptable" by the Texas Education Agency.

The district changed to a four day school week in fall 2022.

Schools
Timpson ISD has three campuses - 
Timpson High School (Grades 9-12)
Timpson Middle School (Grades 6-8)
Timpson Elementary School (Grades PK-5)

References

External links
Timpson ISD

School districts in Shelby County, Texas